The 25th annual Venice International Film Festival was held from 27 August to 10 September 1964.

Jury
 Mario Soldati (Italy) (head of jury)
 Rudolf Arnheim (USA)
 Ove Brusendorff (Denmark)
 Thorold Dickinson (UK)
 Ricardo Muñoz Suay (Spain)
 Georges Sadoul (France)
 Jerzy Toeplitz (Poland)

Films in competition

Awards
Golden Lion:
Red Desert (Michelangelo Antonioni)
Special Jury Prize:
Hamlet (Grigori Kozintsev)
The Gospel According to St. Matthew (Pier Paolo Pasolini)
Volpi Cup:
 Best Actor - Tom Courtenay - (King & Country)
 Best Actress - Harriet Andersson  - (To Love)
Best First Work
La vie à l'envers (Alain Jessua)
San Giorgio Prize
Nothing But a Man (Michael Roemer)
FIPRESCI Prize
Red Desert (Michelangelo Antonioni)
OCIC Award
The Gospel According to St. Matthew (Pier Paolo Pasolini)
Pasinetti Award
La vie à l'envers (Alain Jessua)
Parallel Sections - Passenger (Andrzej Munk)
Lion of San Marco - Grand Prize
Skoplje '63 (Veljko Bulajić)
Best Documentary - L'enigma Oppenhemier (Leandro Castellani)

References

External links
 
 Venice Film Festival 1964 Awards on IMDb

Venice International Film Festival
Venice International Film Festival
Venice Film Festival
Film
Venice International Film Festival
Venice International Film Festival